John Goldup Davies (8 January 1914 – 11 August 1989) was a British swimmer.

Swimming career
Davies competed in the men's 200 metre breaststroke at the 1948 Summer Olympics.

He represented England and won double gold in the 220 yards Breaststroke and 330 yards medley relay, at the 1938 British Empire Games in Sydney, Australia. At the ASA National British Championships he won the 220 yards breaststroke title in 1946.

He died in Wellington, was cremated, and was buried at Mākara Cemetery.

References

1914 births
1989 deaths
British male swimmers
Olympic swimmers of Great Britain
Swimmers at the 1948 Summer Olympics
People from Bermondsey
Sportspeople from London
Swimmers at the 1938 British Empire Games
Commonwealth Games medallists in swimming
Commonwealth Games gold medallists for England
Burials at Makara Cemetery
People from Wellington City
Medallists at the 1938 British Empire Games